Gul Bardhan (1928 – 29 November 2010) was a choreographer and theatre personality based in Bhopal, Madhya Pradesh, India. She was associated with the Indian People's Theatre Association. She was the co-founder of the Little Ballet Troupe. a dance and puppet company formed in Bombay in 1952, and headed by Shanti Bardhan, her husband. After the death of her husband in 1954, Gul Bardhan headed the troupe. The troupe was later renamed "Ranga Shri Little Ballet Troupe" and performed in different countries. She received several awards, including the Sangeet Natak Academy award and the Padma Shri (the fourth highest civilian award of India) in 2010.

References

Recipients of the Padma Shri in arts
Indian women choreographers
Indian choreographers
1928 births
2010 deaths
Dancers from Madhya Pradesh
Artists from Bhopal
20th-century Indian dancers
20th-century Indian women artists
Women artists from Madhya Pradesh
Recipients of the Sangeet Natak Akademi Award